Assigny is a commune in the Cher department in the Centre-Val de Loire region of France.

Geography
The commune is home to one of the highest points of the department and is the source of several streams and small rivers.

Population

Places of interest
 The church of St. Saturnin, dating from the twelfth century.
 The château de La Vallée, dating from the sixteenth century.

See also
Communes of the Cher department

References

Communes of Cher (department)